Nicolae Coval (19 December 1904 – 15 January 1970) was a Soviet and Moldavian politician.

Biography

Nicolae Coval was born on 19 December 1904 in the city of Camenca, Russian Empire (now in Transnistria, Republic of Moldova). Nicolae Coval became a member of the CPSU in 1939; in the period 1940–1945, he served as the People's Commissar for Agriculture of the MSSR. At Congresses I - IV, X - XII of the Communist Party of the MSSR was elected as a member of the Central Committee. He also served as deputy to the Supreme Soviet of the USSR (in Legislative 1, 2, 6 and 7) and deputy of the Supreme Soviet of the USSR (in the 1-3 legislatures).

Coval was the prime minister of Moldavian SSR (17 April 1945 – 5 January 1946). Coval was also the First Secretary of the Moldavian Communist Party (5 January 1946 - July 1950).

During his rule, the hunger of 1946-1947 occurred in the Moldаvian SSR, when more than 170 thousand people died. The hunger had partially objective reasons (relatively low harvest), while partially was organized by Soviet Authorities (Joseph Stalin and the Communist Party), which urged the completion of Soviet grain stocks. The hunger was stopped in the autumn of 1947, after which a forced collectivisation of agriculture in Bessarabia was ordered by Soviet authorities.

Bibliography

 *** - Enciclopedia sovietică moldovenească (Chişinău, 1970–1977)

1904 births
1970 deaths
People from Camenca District
People from Olgopolsky Uyezd
First Secretaries of the Communist Party of Moldavia
Heads of government of the Moldavian Soviet Socialist Republic
Members of the Supreme Soviet of the Moldavian Soviet Socialist Republic
People's commissars and ministers of the Moldavian Soviet Socialist Republic
First convocation members of the Soviet of Nationalities
Second convocation members of the Soviet of Nationalities
Third convocation members of the Soviet of Nationalities
Recipients of the Order of Lenin
Recipients of the Order of the Red Banner of Labour